Agnė Sereikaitė (born 19 October 1994 in Vilnius, Lithuania) is a Lithuanian short track speed skater.

In 2014 Winter Olympics Sereikaitė participated in all three individual events and become first ever Lithuanian short track skater to qualify for the Olympics. She finished 24th at 500 metre distance, got penalized at 1000 metre distance and reached semifinals of 1500 metre event, where she end up breaking her personal record by almost 5 seconds and finishing 16th overall. She was selected to be Lithuanian flag bearer at Olympic closing ceremony.

In October 2018 Sreikaitė announced about her retirement from competitive sport.

References 
sportresult.com profile

1994 births
Living people
Lithuanian female short track speed skaters
Olympic short track speed skaters of Lithuania
Short track speed skaters at the 2014 Winter Olympics
Sportspeople from Vilnius
Universiade medalists in short track speed skating
Universiade bronze medalists for Lithuania
Competitors at the 2013 Winter Universiade
Competitors at the 2015 Winter Universiade